Tukhula Jacobs (born 10 December 1994) is a Namibian tennis player.

Jacobs has a career high ATP singles ranking of 1124 achieved on 25 June 2018 and a career high ATP doubles ranking of 1543, achieved on 11 June 2018.

Jacobs has represented Namibia at the Davis Cup, where he has a win-loss record of 26–13.

Jacobs is the brother of tennis player Lesedi Sheya Jacobs.

External links

Tukhula Jacobs at University of South Alabama

1994 births
Living people
Namibian male tennis players
South Alabama Jaguars athletes
Sportspeople from Windhoek
College men's tennis players in the United States